Batavia is a city mainly in Kane County and partly in DuPage County in the U.S. state of Illinois. Located in the Chicago metropolitan area, it was founded in 1833 and is the oldest city in Kane County. Per the 2020 census, the population was 26,098.

During the latter part of the 19th century, Batavia, home to six American-style windmill manufacturing companies, became known as "The Windmill City." Fermi National Accelerator Laboratory, a federal government-sponsored high-energy physics laboratory, where both the bottom quark and the top quark were first detected, is located just east of the city limits.

Batavia is part of a vernacular region known as the Tri-City area, along with St. Charles and Geneva, all western suburbs of similar size and relative socioeconomic condition.

History
Batavia was settled in 1833 by Christopher Payne and his family. Originally called Big Woods for the wild growth throughout the settlement, the town was renamed by local judge and former Congressman Isaac Wilson in 1840 after his former home of Batavia, New York. Because Judge Wilson owned the majority of the town, he was given permission to rename it.

Batavia's settlement was delayed one year by the Black Hawk War, in which Abraham Lincoln was a citizen soldier, and Zachary Taylor and Jefferson Davis were Army officers. Although there is no direct evidence that Lincoln, Taylor, or Davis visited the future site of Batavia, there are writings by Lincoln that refer to "Head of the Big Woods," Batavia's original name. The city was incorporated on July 27, 1872.

After the death of her husband, Mary Todd Lincoln was an involuntary resident of the Batavia Institute on May 20, 1875. At the time the institute was known as Bellevue Place, a sanitarium for women. Mrs. Lincoln was released four months later on September 11, 1875. In the late 19th century, Batavia was a major manufacturer of the Conestoga wagons used in the country's westward expansion. Into the early 20th century, most of the windmill operated waterpumps in use by America's farms were made at one of three windmill manufacturing companies in Batavia. Many of the limestone buildings of these factories remain in use as government and commercial offices, and storefronts. The Aurora Elgin and Chicago Railway constructed a power plant in southern Batavia and added a branch to the city in 1902. The Campana Factory was built in 1936 to manufacture cosmetics for The Campana Company, particularly Italian Balm, the nation's best-selling hand lotion at the time.

Geography

Batavia is located on the Fox River at  (41.8488583, −88.3084400).

Demographics
As of the 2020 census there were 26,098 people, 9,728 households, and 6,947 families residing in the city. The racial makeup of the city was 84.23% White, 2.48% African American, 0.24% Native American, 2.28% Asian, 0.02% Pacific Islander, 3.25% from other races, and 7.51% from two or more races. Hispanic or Latino of any race were 9.17% of the population.

There were 9,728 households, out of which 68.14% had children under the age of 18 living with them, 63.70% were married couples living together, 6.31% had a female householder with no husband present, and 28.59% were non-families. 23.97% of all households were made up of individuals, and 12.52% had someone living alone who was 65 years of age or older. The average household size was 3.29 and the average family size was 2.71.

The city's age distribution consisted of 26.3% under the age of 18, 5.9% from 18 to 24, 25.4% from 25 to 44, 27.4% from 45 to 64, and 15.0% who were 65 years of age or older. The median age was 38.8 years. For every 100 females, there were 96.4 males. For every 100 females age 18 and over, there were 95.1 males.

The median income for a household in the city was $97,995, and the median income for a family was $123,247. Males had a median income of $69,895 versus $39,602 for females. The per capita income for the city was $46,134. About 3.6% of families and 5.9% of the population were below the poverty line, including 9.0% of those under age 18 and 5.5% of those age 65 or over.

Note: the US Census treats Hispanic/Latino as an ethnic category. This table excludes Latinos from the racial categories and assigns them to a separate category. Hispanics/Latinos can be of any race.

Economy
Aldi, Inc., the U.S. subsidiary of Aldi Süd, has its headquarters in Batavia.

Fermilab is located just outside the town borders and serves as employment for many of the town's residents.

According to the City's 2017 Comprehensive Annual Financial Report, the top employers in the city are:

Arts and culture
Batavia is served by Batavia Public Library District, which was founded in April 1881 as a township library; the first Board of Library Trustees was elected in April 1882. It converted to a district library in June 1975. The library serves most of Batavia Township, Kane County, Illinois and portions of Winfield Township, DuPage County, Illinois, Geneva Township, Kane County, Illinois, and Blackberry Township, Kane County, Illinois. Its current facility opened in January 2002.

Government 
Batavia is a part of Illinois' 11th Congressional District, represented by Democrat Bill Foster. From 2013 to 2023, it was part of the 14th Congressional District, which was represented by Randy Hultgren and later Lauren Underwood.
 
Linda Holmes, Karina Villa, Barbara Hernandez, Matt Hanson, and Maura Hirschauer -- all Democrats -- represent parts of Batavia in the Illinois General Assembly.

Batavia is governed by a 14-member city council. There are seven wards in the city, and each ward elects two aldermen. The mayor chairs the city council and is elected citywide every four years.

Jeffery Schielke has been Mayor of Batavia since 1981.

Education
Batavia is served by Batavia Public School District No. 101. The district currently consists of six K–5 elementary schools, one 6–8 middle school, and Batavia High School. Small pockets of the city are served by Geneva Community Unit School District 304 and West Aurora Public School District 129.

Infrastructure

Transportation
Some bus transportation is serviced by Pace. The Geneva and Aurora Metra train stations are nearby. Paths for biking and walking exist along the Fox River.

Batavia is considered car-dependent and somewhat bikeable.

Major streets include:
 Batavia Avenue (IL-31)
 Main Street (Route 10)
 Randall Road
 Washington Street/River Street (IL-25)
 Wilson Street

Notable people

 Ken Anderson, quarterback with the Cincinnati Bengals; grew up in Batavia
 Charlie Briggs, second baseman with the Chicago Browns
 Bernard J. Cigrand, father of Flag Day; lived in Batavia
 Jackie DeShannon, 1960s singer-songwriter; attended Batavia High School
 J. W. Eddy, 19th-century politician, lawyer and railway engineer, acquaintance of Abraham Lincoln; lived in Batavia 
 Winfield S. Hall, physiologist and writer
 Dan Issel, power forward and coach in the Basketball Hall of Fame
 Mary Todd Lincoln, President Abraham Lincoln's wife; committed by her son to the Bellevue Place psychiatric hospital in Batavia (1875)
 Samuel D. Lockwood, politician and judge
 Meredith Mallory, former US Congressman
 John F. Petit, businessman and politician; lived in Batavia
 Birgit Ridderstedt, folk singer and producer
 Craig Sager, sportscaster for TNT and TBS; born in Batavia
 Isaac Wilson, former US Congressman

See also

List of municipalities in Illinois
National Register of Historic Places listings in Kane County, Illinois

References

External links

 

 
Cities in Illinois
1833 establishments in Illinois
Cities in DuPage County, Illinois
Cities in Kane County, Illinois
Populated places established in 1833